This is a list of New Zealand television events and premieres which occurred, or are scheduled to occur, in 1995, the 35th year of continuous operation of television in New Zealand.

This is a list of New Zealand television-related events in 1995.

Events
23 February – US sitcom Friends begins on TV2.
22 May – TV2  begins repeating several episodes of Shining Time Station for one final broadcast.
4 August – TV2 transmits Shining Time Station  for the very last time.
Channel 2 changes its name back to TV2.
One Network News extended from 30 minutes to 60 minutes and Holmes moves to 7:00pm.
TV One and TV3 commenced their 24-hour transmissions, 7 days a week.
The popular children's storybook series Hairy Maclary has been spawned into a short lived 5 minute animated television series. Running for only 10 episodes, the series will premiere on TV2.
Children's programmes return to broadcasting on TV One.

Debuts

Domestic
31 December – Riding High (TV2) (1995-1996)
Hercules: The Legendary Journeys (Channel 2) (also United States) (1995–1999)
Mirror, Mirror (TV2) (also on Network Ten Australia) (1995)
Hairy Maclary (TV2) (1995)

International
19 February –  Stand by Your Man (Channel 2)
21 February –  Pie in the Sky (TV One)
23 February –  Friends (TV2)
4 March – / Time Trax (TV2)
4 March –  The Big Byte (TV2)
6 March –  ER (TV2)
18 April –  Luv (TV One)
30 April –  Frannie's Turn (TV2)
6 May –  Gladiators (TV2)
5 June –  Animaniacs (TV2)
8 June –  Chicago Hope (TV2)
8 June – / Due South (TV2)
20 June –  The Tomorrow People (1992) (TV One)
6 July –  The Knock (TV One)
7 July –  The Unpleasant World of Penn & Teller (TV2)
20 July –  Ellen (TV3)
24 July –  Texas Justice (TV2)
6 August –  Avenger Penguins (TV2)
7 August –  Aladdin (TV3)
18 December –  The Gordon Elliott Show (TV3)
18 December –  Postman Pat and the Tuba (TV One)
25 December –  Mole's Christmas (TV2)
30 December –  Touched By An Angel (TV3)
31 December –  Flipper (1995) (TV2)
 Where on Earth Is Carmen Sandiego? (TV2)
 Party of Five (TV2)
 The Tick (TV2)
 The George Carlin Show (TV2)

Changes to network affiliation
This is a list of programs which made their premiere on a New Zealand television network that had previously premiered on another New Zealand television network. The networks involved in the switch of allegiances are predominantly both free-to-air networks or both subscription television networks. Programs that have their free-to-air/subscription television premiere, after previously premiering on the opposite platform (free-to air to subscription/subscription to free-to air) are not included. In some cases, programs may still air on the original television network. This occurs predominantly with programs shared between subscription television networks.

Domestic

International

Television shows
What Now (1981–present)
Letter to Blanchy (1989, 1994–1997)
New Zealand's Funniest Home Videos (1990–1995)
60 Minutes (1990–present)
Wheel of Fortune (1991–1996)
Shortland Street (1992–present)
You and Me (1993–1998)
Melody Rules (1993–1995)

Ending this year
Melody Rules (TV3) (1993–1995)
New Zealand's Funniest Home Videos (TV2) (1990–1995)
The Son of a Gunn Show (TV2) (1992–1995)
Hairy Maclary (TV2) (1995)